Cypraecassis testiculus, common name the reticulated cowry helmet,  is a species of large sea snail, a marine gastropod mollusk in the family Cassidae, the helmet snails and bonnet snails.

There is one subspecies :  Cypraecassis testiculus senegalica (Gmelin, 1791)

Distribution
This species can be found on rocky shores in the Atlantic Ocean (Angola, North Carolina to Northeast Brazil), the Gulf of Mexico, the Caribbean Sea and the Lesser Antilles.

Description 
The maximum recorded shell length is 85 mm.

Habitat 
The minimum recorded depth for this species is 0 m; maximum recorded depth is 60 m. Freshly-dead 'crabbed' shells have been trapped at 150–180 metres depth off West coast Barbados in the Lesser Antilles.

References

 Gofas, S.; Afonso, J.P.; Brandào, M. (Ed.). (S.a.). Conchas e Moluscos de Angola = Coquillages et Mollusques d'Angola. [Shells and molluscs of Angola]. Universidade Agostinho / Elf Aquitaine Angola: Angola. 140 pp. 
 Rosenberg, G., F. Moretzsohn, and E. F. García. 2009. Gastropoda (Mollusca) of the Gulf of Mexico, Pp. 579–699 in Felder, D.L. and D.K. Camp (eds.), Gulf of Mexico–Origins, Waters, and Biota. Biodiversity. Texas A&M Press, College Station, Texas.

External links
 

Cassidae
Gastropods described in 1758
Taxa named by Carl Linnaeus